Nunzen, Papua New Guinea is located in Sialum Rural LLG, Morobe Province. It is located east of Sialum between the Seŋe and Lazo Rivers.

The village has 3 main sites including Nunzen Main, Menyamen and Old Nunzen.

The Bakesu Revival Church head office is located in Menyamen, which is on the ocean side of the road that runs between Finchaffen and Sialum.

Three languages are spoken in Nunzen: Tok Pisin, Ono and English.

Populated places in Morobe Province